Robert Perkins Bass (September 1, 1873July 29, 1960) was an American farmer, forestry expert, and Republican politician from Peterborough, New Hampshire. He served in both houses of the New Hampshire Legislature and as chairman of the state's Forestry Commission before serving as the 53rd governor of New Hampshire from 1911 to 1913.

He started one of the state's political dynasties. Both his son, Perkins Bass, and grandson, Charles F. Bass, were elected to the U.S. House of Representatives. His wife, Edith Harland Bird, was the daughter of Massachusetts businessman Charles Sumner Bird. His daughter, Joanne, was the first wife of Marshall Field IV, heir to the Marshall Field's fortune and publishing mogul.

Early life
The son of Perkins Bass and Clara (Foster) Bass, he was born in Chicago, Illinois, but his family moved to Peterborough when he was nine. He grew up on a family farm that is still owned by his descendants. He graduated from Harvard College in 1896.

Gertrude Bass Warner (May 14, 1863 – July 29, 1951), an art collector with particular interests in Asian art, was his sister.

Career
He was elected to the New Hampshire House of Representatives in 1905 and 1909 and the New Hampshire Senate in 1910. He was the state's governor from 1911 to 1913.

His status was hurt, however, after 1912. That year, he had supported Theodore Roosevelt for president, in the breakaway Progressive Party, against the Republican incumbent, William Howard Taft. The move threw the state Republicans into disarray and led to a Democratic governor and a Democratic legislature. In retaliation, the party rejected Bass when he sought a US Senate seat in 1913 and 1926.

Bass is remembered today for his stint as chairman of the New Hampshire Forestry Commission when popular concern with forests' well-being was intense because of extreme overlogging in the White Mountains. Also notable is his sponsorship of legislation that led to the first direct primary law east of the Mississippi River.

In 1945, Bass, along with retired Supreme Court Associate Justice Owen J. Roberts, convened the assembly that produced the Dublin Declaration, which proposed the transformation of the United Nations General Assembly into a world legislature with "limited but definite and adequate power for the prevention of war."

References

External links 

 Bass at New Hampshire's Division of Historic Resources
 The Papers of Robert P. Bass at Dartmouth College Library

1873 births
1960 deaths
Politicians from Chicago
People from Peterborough, New Hampshire
Harvard College alumni
Republican Party governors of New Hampshire
Republican Party members of the New Hampshire House of Representatives
Republican Party New Hampshire state senators
New Hampshire Progressives (1912)